Willetton Tigers is an NBL1 West club based in Perth, Western Australia. The club fields a team in both the Men's and Women's NBL1 West. The club is a division of Willetton Basketball Association (WBA), the major administrative basketball organisation in the Melville/Canning region. The Tigers play their home games at Willetton Basketball Stadium.

Club history

Background
Willetton Basketball Association (WBA) was formed in 1973 as a division of the Willetton Sports Club (WSC), with teams representing the club competing in the Canning Districts Basketball Association in Riverton. Following strong growth in participation, four outdoor courts were established in 1978/79 at the current site of Willetton Basketball Stadium on Burrendah Boulevard and Willetton basketball teams relocated from Canning to form its own domestic competition. In 1979/80, Tangney District Basketball Association was formed by amalgamating Melville Districts Basketball Association and Willetton Basketball Division of WSC. Following further growth in numbers, the existing facility was expanded to eight outdoor courts, and by the end of 1985, a new four-court indoor stadium was completed. The stadium did not receive expansion until 2020, with an extra four courts added.

In 1987, both the A-grade men's and women's teams won premierships, with the men reaching the grand final again in 1988.

SBL / NBL1 West
1989 saw the formation of the State Basketball League (SBL) with both a men's and women's competition. Willetton, trading as the Tigers, entered a team into both the Men's SBL and Women's SBL.

Over the first seven seasons of the SBL, the Tigers saw little success. In 1996, the women's team made their maiden WSBL Grand Final, where they lost 66–61 to the Swan City Mustangs. They went on to play in four straight grand finals, winning championships in 1997 and 1999. The Tigers women had another dominant run beginning in the mid-2000s, playing in six WSBL Grand Finals between 2004 and 2011, with championships coming in 2004, 2005, 2009, 2010 and 2011. The men's team meanwhile played in their first MSBL Grand Final in 2002, where they lost 101–97 to the Perry Lakes Hawks. In 2008, they played in their second MSBL Grand Final, where they lost 101–82 to the Goldfields Giants. In 2010, they played in their third MSBL Grand Final and won their maiden championship with a 107–96 win over the Lakeside Lightning.

In 2015, the Tigers women played in their first WSBL Grand Final since 2011, where they were defeated 68–63 by the Rockingham Flames. They returned to the grand final in 2016, where they won their eighth WSBL championship with a 60–58 win over the Joondalup Wolves.

In 2021, the SBL was rebranded as NBL1 West. The Tigers women were crowned minor premiers in the inaugural NBL1 West season and reached their 13th grand final, where they defeated the Joondalup Wolves 65–54 to win their ninth championship. They returned to the grand final in 2022, where they lost 87–61 to the Warwick Senators.

Accolades
Women
Championships: 9 (1997, 1999, 2004, 2005, 2009, 2010, 2011, 2016, 2021)
Grand Final appearances: 14 (1996, 1997, 1998, 1999, 2004, 2005, 2008, 2009, 2010, 2011, 2015, 2016, 2021, 2022)
Minor premierships: 9 (1998, 1999, 2003, 2005, 2008, 2010, 2011, 2013, 2021)

Men
Championships: 1 (2010)
Grand Final appearances: 3 (2002, 2008, 2010)
Minor premierships: 3 (2000, 2006, 2017)

References

External links

WBA's website

Basketball teams established in 1989
1989 establishments in Australia
Basketball teams in Western Australia
NBL1 West teams